The Women's 10m Air Rifle Standing SH1 shooting event at the 2004 Summer Paralympics was competed  on 18 September. It was won by Manuela Schmermund, representing .

Preliminary

18 Sept. 2004, 09:00

Final round

18 Sept. 2004, 12:00

References

W
Para